Adrian Justin Jimena Ililau (born 21 April 2000) is a Palauan sprinter.

He ran a personal best time of 11.43 in the 100 metres at the 2020 Summer Olympics in Tokyo, but did not advance beyond the preliminary heats.

He represented Palau in basketball at the 2017 FIBA Under-17 Oceania Championship held in Guam.
He is pursuing a major in environmental marine sciences at Palau Community College, and his field studies focused on the effects of heat stress on corals.

References

External links
 

2000 births
Living people
Athletes (track and field) at the 2020 Summer Olympics
Olympic track and field athletes of Palau
Palauan male sprinters